Vaipae–Tautu is a Cook Islands electoral division returning one member to the Cook Islands Parliament.  Its current representative is Kitai Teinakore, who has held the seat since 2018.

The electorate was created in 1981, when the Constitution Amendment (No. 9) Act 1980–1981 adjusted electorate boundaries and split the electorate of Aitutaki into three.

References

Aitutaki
Cook Islands electorates